The women's team compound competition at the 2013 World Archery Championships took place on 29 September – 6 October 2013 in Belek, Turkey.

18 countries entered the full quota of 3 archers into the qualification round, thus becoming eligible for the team competition. The combined totals of the 3 archers from each country in the qualification round were added together, and the 16 teams with the highest combined scores competed in the elimination rounds.

The gold medal was won by second seed Colombia.

Schedule
All times are local (UTC+02:00).

Qualification round
Pre-tournament world rankings ('WR') are taken from the 28 August 2013 World Archery Rankings.

 Qualified for eliminations

Elimination rounds

References

2013 World Archery Championships
World